Martin Ostoja-Starzewski is a Polish-Canadian-American scientist and engineer, a professor of mechanical science and engineering at the University of Illinois Urbana-Champaign. His research includes work on deterministic and stochastic mechanics: random and fractal media, representative elementary volume in linear and nonlinear material systems, universal elastic anisotropy index, random fields, and bridging continuum mechanics to fluctuation theorem.

Education and Career
Ostoja-Starzewski is an immigrant to Canada and the United States from Poland. He received his undergraduate education at Cracow University of Technology, followed by Master’s and Ph.D. degrees at McGill University. 
He worked as a faculty member at Purdue University, Michigan State University, Institute of Paper Science and Technology at Georgia Tech, McGill University, and (since 2006) at the University of Illinois Urbana-Champaign. He is also affiliated with the university's Beckman Institute, National Center for Supercomputing Applications and Institute for Condensed Matter Theory. He has been Site co-Director of the NSF Industry/University Cooperative Research Center for Novel High Voltage/Temperature Materials and Structures (2012-2022).

Recognition 
He serves as Editor of Acta Mechanica, Editor-in-Chief of the Journal of Thermal Stresses, and Chair Managing Editor of Mathematics and Mechanics of Complex Systems. He is Fellow of ASME, American Academy of Mechanics, Society of Engineering Science, and Associate Fellow of AIAA. His distinctions include Timoshenko Distinguished Visitor at Stanford University (2012), the Worcester Reed Warner Medal of ASME (2018), membership in European Academy of Sciences and Arts (2022), and Rothschild Distinguished Visiting Fellow at Isaac Newton Institute for Mathematical Sciences (2023).

Books 
	D. Jeulin and M. Ostoja-Starzewski, Eds., Mechanics of Random and Multiscale Microstructures, CISM, Vol. 430, Springer, Wien-New York, 2001.  (print), 9783709127803 (online)
	M. Ostoja-Starzewski, Microstructural Randomness and Scaling in Mechanics of Materials, CRC Press (2007). 
	J. Ignaczak and M. Ostoja-Starzewski, Thermoelasticity with Finite Wave Speeds, Oxford University Press (2009). 
	A. Malyarenko and M. Ostoja-Starzewski, Tensor-Valued Random Fields for Continuum Physics, Cambridge University Press (2019). 
	A. Malyarenko, M. Ostoja-Starzewski and A. Amiri-Hezaveh, Random Fields of Piezoelectricity and Piezomagnetism: Correlation Structures, Springer (2020).

References 

	Faculty page at the University of Illinois at Urbana-Champaign.
	Publication Timeline.
	Google Scholar page.
	ResearchGate profile.

University of Illinois Urbana-Champaign faculty
McGill University alumni
Tadeusz Kościuszko University of Technology alumni
20th-century Polish engineers
21st-century American engineers
Polish expatriates in the United States
Polish expatriates in Canada
Academic journal editors
Fellows of the American Society of Mechanical Engineers
Canada Research Chairs
Year of birth missing (living people)
Living people